The 1933 Dartmouth Indians football team was an American football team that represented Dartmouth College as an independent during the 1933 college football season. In their seventh and final season under head coach Jackson Cannell, the Indians compiled a 4–4–1 record. Philip Glazer was the team captain.

George Stangle was the team's leading scorer, with 30 points, from five touchdowns.

Dartmouth played its home games at Memorial Field on the college campus in Hanover, New Hampshire.

Schedule

References

Dartmouth
Dartmouth Big Green football seasons
Dartmouth Indians football